José Monroy may refer to:

 José Mariano Monroy (18th century astronomer) (born ?– died ?), participant in Spain's Expedition of Limits to the Orinoco (1754–1761)
 José Monroy (racing driver) (born 1980), Portuguese racing driver
 José Monroy (footballer) (born 1996), Mexican footballer